Strand may refer to:

Topography
The flat area of land bordering a body of water, a:
 Beach
 Shoreline
Strand swamp, a type of swamp habitat in Florida

Places

Africa 
Strand, Western Cape, a seaside town in South Africa 
Strand Street, a road in Cape Town, South Africa

Asia
A park alongside the river Ganges in Chandannagar, India
Strand Road, Kolkata, a road alongside the river Ganges in Kolkata, India

Australia 
The Strand Arcade, a Victorian shopping arcade in Sydney, Australia
The Strand, Townsville, a beachside foreshore in Townsville, Australia
The Strand, Auckland, a street in Auckland, New Zealand
The Strand Station, the former main railway station of Auckland, New Zealand, known as The Strand for excursion trains

United Kingdom 
Strand (UK Parliament constituency)
Strand, County Down, a townland in County Down, Northern Ireland
Strand, London, a street in Central London
New Strand Shopping Centre, a shopping centre in Bootle, Merseyside
St Mary le Strand (parish)
Strand District (Metropolis), a local government district within the metropolitan area of London, England, from 1855 to 1900
The Strand, recreation area in Gillingham, Kent

Europe 
Strand (island), a German island that was split into two by the Burchardi Flood of 1634
Ștrand, a district of Sibiu, Romania
Štrand, a beach on the Danube in Novi Sad, Serbia
Strand, Akershus, a village area in Bærum municipality in Viken county, Norway
Strand, Friesland, a hamlet in Súdwest-Fryslân, Friesland, the Netherlands
Strand, Nordland, a village in Sortland municipality in Nordland county, Norway
Strand, Norway, a municipality in Rogaland county, Norway
Strand, Vestfold, a village in Sandefjord municipality in Vestfold og Telemark county, Norway

North America

Canada
Strand Fiord Pass, a pass on Axel Heiberg Island, Nunavut, Canada

United States
Strand, Iowa
Grand Strand, a stretch of beaches in North and South Carolina
Silver Strand (San Diego), or The Strand, a narrow isthmus connecting Coronado Island with Imperial Beach, California
Strand National Historic Landmark District, a neighborhood in Galveston, Texas
The Strand (bicycle path), a pedestrian/bike path along the coast of the South Bay, Los Angeles

Art, entertainment, and media

Music
Groups
The Strand, a British hard rock band that eventually evolved into the Sex Pistols
Works
Strand (album), an album by the Spinanes
"Baile's Strand", a song on the album Crógacht by the band Suidakra, based on the same Celtic legend as Yeats' play
"Do the Strand," a song by the British band Roxy Music

Periodicals
The Strand, a publication of Victoria University in the University of Toronto
The Strand Magazine, a British monthly founded in the 1890s (named after the street in London)

Other art, entertainment, and media
Strand (film), a 2009 Iranian film
The Strand (radio), a daily BBC World Service arts programme
Victor Strand, a character in Fear the Walking Dead
T.K Strand, a character in 9-1-1: Lone Star

Biology
Coding strand, a strand of DNA
A strand of hair

Brands and enterprises
Strand (cigarette), a 1950s/1960s brand of cigarette notorious for its failed advertising campaign, "You're never alone with a Strand"
Strand Bookstore, a famous bookstore in New York City
Strand Cinema, art deco cinema in Belfast, Northern Ireland
Strand Hotel (also known as The Strand), a colonial-style hotel in Yangon, Myanmar
Strand Lighting, a company supplying lighting equipment to the entertainment industry
Strand Publishing, a publishing company based in Sydney, Australia; publisher of books by Grenville Kent
Strand Releasing, a theatrical distribution company based in Culver City, California
The Strand (Providence theater), a live music venue and theater in Providence, Rhode Island

Other uses
Strand (programming language), a parallel programming system 
Strand (surname)
Strand, part of an electrical cable
Strand (mathematics), part of a knot as meant in the definition of tricolorability

See also
Strand Church (disambiguation)
Strand station (disambiguation)
Strand Theatre (disambiguation)
Stranded (disambiguation)
Strandloper (disambiguation)